

Dunlap's Creek Bridge was the first arch bridge in the United States built of cast iron. It was designed by Richard Delafield and built by the United States Army Corps of Engineers.<ref
 name="jackson">
</ref> Constructed from 1836 to 1839 on the National Road in Brownsville, Pennsylvania, it remains in use today. It is listed on the National Register of Historic Places and is a National Historic Civil Engineering Landmark (1978). It is located in the Brownsville Commercial Historic District and supports Market Street, the local main thoroughfare. Due to the steep sides of the Monongahela River valley, there is only room for two short streets parallel to the river's shore and graded mild enough to be comfortable to walk before the terrain rises too steeply for business traffic.

History
There have been four structures on this site. The first two collapsed in 1808 and 1820. The third, a wood-framed structure, needed replacement by 1832.

This bridge is constructed using five parallel tubular ribs, each made of 9 elliptical segments to form the  arch.

See also
List of bridges documented by the Historic American Engineering Record in Pennsylvania
List of Registered Historic Places in Fayette County, Pennsylvania
List of historic civil engineering landmarks

Notes

References

External links

Dunlap’s Creek Bridge: Historical Marker Database
[ National Register nomination form]
Dunlap's Creek Bridge: History and Heritage of Civil Engineering

Bridges in Fayette County, Pennsylvania
Road bridges on the National Register of Historic Places in Pennsylvania
Historic American Engineering Record in Pennsylvania
Historic Civil Engineering Landmarks
National Register of Historic Places in Fayette County, Pennsylvania
History of Fayette County, Pennsylvania
Iron bridges in the United States
Arch bridges in the United States
National Road